Castricum railway station is located in Castricum, the Netherlands. The station opened on 1 May 1867 as part of the Den Helder–Amsterdam railway.

Train services
, the following services call at Castricum:
2× per hour intercity service (Schagen -) Alkmaar - Amsterdam - Utrecht - Eindhoven - Maastricht
2× per hour intercity service Den Helder - Amsterdam - Utrecht - Nijmegen
2× per hour local service (sprinter) Hoorn - Alkmaar - Uitgeest - Haarlem - Amsterdam

Bus services
These services stop outside the station.

External links
NS website 
Dutch public transport travel planner 

Railway stations in North Holland
Railway stations opened in 1867
Railway stations on the Staatslijn K
Castricum